Craig Dowsett (born 9 February 1960) is a former Australian rules footballer who played with Geelong in the Victorian Football League (VFL).

Dowsett was recruited locally, from Leopold. He made four appearances in the 1978 VFL season, including Geelong's elimination final loss to Carlton. Over the next three seasons he added just four more games to his tally.

He later played for Golden Square in the Bendigo Football League and won the Michelsen Medal in 1986.

References

1960 births
Australian rules footballers from Victoria (Australia)
Geelong Football Club players
Leopold Football Club (Geelong) players
Golden Square Football Club players
Living people